Eugene Wesley "Rod" Roddenberry Jr. (born February 5, 1974) is an American television producer and the chief executive officer of Roddenberry Entertainment. He is the son of Star Trek creator Gene Roddenberry and Majel Barrett and is an executive producer on  Star Trek: Discovery, Star Trek: Picard, Star Trek: Lower Decks, Star Trek: Prodigy and Star Trek: Strange New Worlds.

Early life
Roddenberry was born in Los Angeles, California, the son of actress Majel Barrett and writer and producer Gene Roddenberry, creator of the American science fiction series Star Trek. Roddenberry went to the John Thomas Dye School in Bel Air and Harvard-Westlake School in North Hollywood. and then attended Hampshire College in the early 1990s.

As a young man, Roddenberry was not closely familiar with Star Trek, having never even watched it. In 1991, when he was 17 years old, his father died, after which he began to examine Star Trek and discover "what made the series special" to its fans. Roddenberry struggled initially with his father's near-legendary stature among Star Trek fans, commenting: "A son cannot identify with a mythical figure; my father was put up on this pedestal throughout my life." However, as Roddenberry heard many moving stories about his father's flaws and follies, he observed, "That allowed me, as a son, not just to connect with him, but actually love him."

Career

In 2001, Roddenberry became chief executive officer of Roddenberry Entertainment, which builds upon his father's work, and develops multimedia science fiction properties including comics, television and film projects.

In mid-2009, the Los Angeles Times reported that Roddenberry approved of the 2009 Star Trek film by J.J. Abrams. Roddenberry opined that the producers and writers "made Star Trek cool again" with the film.

In 2010, Roddenberry, an avid scuba diver since 1993, founded the Roddenberry Dive Team, to allow people "to embark on undersea experiences and discover the diversity beneath the ocean." Roddenberry leads the dive team in its exploration of underwater worlds and hopes to inspire stewardship of the world's oceans. Roddenberry, who holds a Divemaster certification, has led or participated in more than 1,000 dives from exotic locations around the world.

In October 2011, the Roddenberry Foundation, which was founded by Rod Roddenberry, made its largest gift of $5 million to the J. David Gladstone Institutes in San Francisco to establish the Roddenberry Center for Stem Cell Biology and Medicine. The Roddenberry Foundation believes that "the center's innovative technology that converts adult skin cells into life-changing stem cells will radically advance the fight against Alzheimer's and heart disease."

Roddenberry started to become directly involved in the Star Trek franchise in 2016 when he signed on as an executive producer of the TV series Star Trek: Discovery.

Filmography

References

External links

1974 births
Television producers from California
American television writers
American male television writers
Hampshire College alumni
Living people
Writers from Los Angeles
Businesspeople from San Diego
Film producers from California
Gene Roddenberry
Writers from San Diego
Harvard-Westlake School alumni
American chief executives in the media industry
Screenwriters from California